The 2013 Preakness Stakes was the 138th running of the Preakness Stakes thoroughbred horse race. The race was held on May 18, 2013, and was televised on NBC. The race was won by Oxbow.  The post time of the race was  EDT. The race was the 12th race on a card of 13 races. The Maryland Jockey Club reported total attendance of 117,203, the second highest attendance for American thoroughbred racing events in North America during 2013.

Payout 
The 138th Preakness Payout Schedule

 $2 Exacta: (6-9) $301.40
 $2 Trifecta: (6-9-5) $2,061.60
 $1 Superfecta: (6-9-5-1) $1,817.80

Field

2013 Kentucky Derby winner Orb as expected entered the Preakness. It was announced on May 6 that Vyjack and Normandy Invasion would also be starting in The Preakness. Other Derby starters confirmed for The Preakness are Goldencents (17th) and the D. Wayne Lukas trained duo of Oxbow (6th) and Will Take Charge (8th). Later connections of Vyjack and Normandy Invasion withdrew their nominations. Horses that did not start in the Kentucky Derby and were nominated include Illinois Derby winner Departing, Sunland Derby winner Govenor Charlie and Titletown Five.

Nine 3-year-olds were entered for the 138th Preakness Stakes.  The post position draw was held at the International Pavilion in the Pimlico Infield at 6 p.m. on May 15, 2013 and were broadcast live on Horse Racing TV using a blind draw. After the draw Orb was installed as the even money favorite, securing the rail.

Race

On the day of the race, the Kentucky Derby winner Orb was bet down further from even money of 1–1 on the morning line down to a prohibitive odds-on favorite at 3-5 by post time. Florida Derby runner-up Itsmyluckyday was listed as a distant second favorite at -1 while Santa Anita Derby winner Goldencents was the third choice at almost -1 by post time. Oxbow was relegated to longshot status of almost -1, the only horse with longer odds was stablemate Titletown Five at 22–1.

At the break Oxbow was brushed by Will Take Charge, and then steadied as Goldencents, Oxbow and Titletown Five rushed out to the lead in that order.  Orb broke well in sixth place out of nine stakes winning colts. Passing the stands for the first time Oxbow moved to the lead and led by one and one half length over Goldencents completing the first quarter mile in a slow :23-4/5. Making a point to ride three to four paths off the rail Oxbow's jockey Gary Stevens slowed down the pace of the race.  Rounding Pimlico's famous "Clubhouse Turn" Oxbow opened a daylight advantage moving ahead by two and a half lengths tipping the clock at :48-3/5 for the first half mile.  At this point Orb was running in fifth place only two lengths behind Oxbow.

Racing down the backstretch and entering the final turn Oxbow's lead dwindled to only a length and a half with Goldencents and Itsmyluckyday within striking distance.  At the top of the lane Oxbow hit another gear and widened his lead to three lengths over Itsmyluckyday who went six wide and made a menacing run toward the front. The first mile was completed in 1:38 flat on the front end as Derby winner Orb toiled in sixth place.

Nearing the wire, Oxbow, under some hand urging by Stevens, held on to win by one and three quarter lengths over Itsmyluckyday. Louisiana Derby runner-up Mylute closed from the back of the pack under Rosie Napravnik to finish third by two and a quarter lengths (the best finish ever by a woman jockey in the 138-year history of the Preakness). Kentucky Derby winner Orb made up some ground at the end but could finish no better than fourth, nine lengths behind the winner.  Just after the wire NBC announcer Tom Hammond exclaimed, "Gary Stevens just stole the Preakness," with Oxbow becoming the first wire-to-wire winner of the race since Aloma's Ruler in 1982.  The "Hall-of-Fame ride" allowed Oxbow to conserve enough energy to finish the mile and three sixteenths in a final time of 1:57.54; it was the slowest Preakness winning time since 1961.

The full chart 

 Winning Breeder: Colts Next Stables, LLC; (KY)
 Final Time: 1:57.54
 Track: Fast
 Attendance - 117,203

Records

 Winning jockey Gary Stevens became the oldest jockey at aged 50 years to win the race.
 Winning trainer D. Wayne Lukas won his sixth Preakness to move one behind Robert Wyndham Walden for most wins in the second leg of the Triple Crown and won his record fourteenth Triple Crown race.

See also

 2013 Kentucky Derby
 2013 Belmont Stakes

References

Preakness Stakes races
Preakness Stakes
Preakness Stakes
Preakness Stakes
Horse races in Maryland